"Roots Bloody Roots" is a song by Brazilian heavy metal band Sepultura, released in February 1996 as the lead single from the band's sixth album Roots. The song is the band's best known and remains a concert staple to this day, usually being performed on encores. A music video was filmed for the single which features the band performing in a catacomb as well as on the streets with a tribe of percussionists. This video can be found on the VHS We Are What We Are, which was later released on DVD as part of Chaos DVD.

The song also appears in live form on the band's live releases Under a Pale Grey Sky and Live in Sao Paulo. Another live version appears on the limited edition digipak version of the band's 2000 album Nation. Former Sepultura frontman Max Cavalera has also played the song live numerous times with his other bands Soulfly and Cavalera Conspiracy. Recordings of their version can be found on the limited edition versions of the albums Soulfly and Prophecy and as iTunes bonus track on Conquer, as well as on the DVD The Song Remains Insane, plus on the bonus DVDs of Omen and Archangel.

Music video
The music video was directed by Thomas Mignone and won the Kerrang "Video of the Year Award" in 1996, as well as a nomination for the MTV Brazil "Best Rock Video" Award. Filming was done in the catacombs underneath the city of Salvador, where the Brazilian slaves were sold. The video is distinguished from other heavy metal imagery by its atypical use of the natural beauty of Brazil, including its traditional capoeira fight, Timbalada percussionists, and Afro-Brazilians people, as well as the reference to the religion of Candomblé. The video also shows scenes of Catholic churches.

Releases
The single was released on two CDs and 7" vinyl. The first CD was presented in a card foldout digipak case, while the second was in a standard slimline jewel case. Early copies of the digipak version were embossed with a stamp of the band's thorned 'S' logo. The vinyl was a strictly limited edition and was red in colour.

Track listing
Disc one (Digipak)
"Roots Bloody Roots"
"Procreation (Of the Wicked)" (Celtic Frost cover)
"Refuse/Resist" (live)
"Territory"  (live)

Disc two
"Roots Bloody Roots"
"Procreation (Of the Wicked)" (Celtic Frost cover)
"Propaganda" (live)
"Beneath the Remains/Escape to the Void" (live)

7" red vinyl
 "Roots Bloody Roots"
 "Symptom of the Universe" (Black Sabbath cover. It also appears on Blood-Rooted and the limited edition of Roots)

 Refuse/Resist, Territory, Propaganda, Beneath the Remains/Escape to the Void were recorded live in Minneapolis, Minnesota in March 1994

Personnel
Max Cavalera – lead vocals, rhythm guitar
Andreas Kisser – lead guitar, backing vocals
Paulo Jr. – bass
Igor Cavalera – drums, percussion
Produced by Ross Robinson and Sepultura
Recorded and engineered by Ross Robinson
Mixed by Andy Wallace
Assistant engineer: Richard Kaplan

Charts

References

Sepultura songs
1996 singles
Songs written by Max Cavalera
Songs written by Igor Cavalera
Songs written by Andreas Kisser
Songs written by Paulo Jr.
1996 songs
Roadrunner Records singles